Sai'erlong Township (Mandarin: 赛尔龙乡) is a township in Henan Mongol Autonomous County, Huangnan Tibetan Autonomous Prefecture, Qinghai, China. In 2010, Sai'erlong Township had a total population of 3,038: 1,604 males and 1,434 females: 600 aged under 14, 2,259 aged between 15 and 65 and 179 aged over 65.

References 

Township-level divisions of Qinghai
Huangnan Tibetan Autonomous Prefecture